Raymond Leslie Skinner (born 15 October 1940) is a New Zealand rower.

Skinner was born in 1940 in Dunedin, New Zealand. He represented New Zealand at the 1964 Summer Olympics. He is listed as New Zealand Olympian athlete number 199 by the New Zealand Olympic Committee.

References

1940 births
Living people
New Zealand male rowers
Rowers at the 1964 Summer Olympics
Olympic rowers of New Zealand
Sportspeople from Dunedin